These are the singles that reached number one on the Top 100 singles chart in 1971 as published in Cashbox magazine.

See also 
1971 in music
List of Hot 100 number-one singles of 1971 (U.S.)

References
http://members.aol.com/_ht_a/randypny3/cashbox/1971.html
http://www.cashboxmagazine.com/archives/70s_files/1971.html
http://musicseek.info/no1hits/1971.htm

1971
1971 record charts
1971 in American music